Launched in November 2007, Brastilo is a furniture brand directed to the North American market. Their concept is to bring the Brazilian design to their customers, while being environmentally conscious. They are an American subsidiary  of Celulose Irani.

Furniture retailers of the United States
Companies based in Florida